The island nation of Saint Lucia is divided into 10 districts (formerly called Quarters).  The name Quarters or Quartiers originally came from the French period in Saint Lucia (Sainte Lucie in French).  The 2001 and 2010 Census of Saint Lucia refers to the first level administrative divisions as districts.  The FIPS and ISO standards regularly called these divisions quarters or quartiers in French.  The former district of Dauphin Quarter was merged into Gros Islet District and the former district of Praslin Quarter was merged into Micoud District.

History

After the French claimed title of Saint Lucia in 1744, commandant de Rougueville divided Saint Lucia into districts and parishes.  Quarters were administrative districts for the control of settlors and slaves.  The French Surveyor General of Saint Lucia, M. Raussaim, initially divided Saint Lucia into seven quarters.

In 1844, Henry Breen describes how Saint Lucia was divided into two districts, the eastern district on the leeward side of Saint Lucia facing the Atlantic Ocean and the western district on the windward side facing the Caribbean Sea.  It was further divided into eleven quarters or parishes, i.e. Castries, Anse Laraye, Soufriere, Choiseul, Laborie, Vieux Fort, Micoud, Praslin, Dennery, Dauphin, and Gros-ilet.  Each quarter or parish had a town in the coastal bay within its territory that was named the same as the quarter.  Breen further talks about stipendiary magistrates introduced during the period of the apprenticeship system.  These magistrates were as follows:
Castries, Gros-ilet, Daughpin, and Anse Laraye
 Soufriere, Choiseul, Laborie
Vieux Fort, Micoud, Praslin, Dennery

Still later the number of stipendiary magistrates was increased to five:
Castries and Anse Laray
Gros-ilet and Sauphin
Soufriere and Choiseul
Vieux Fort and Laborie
Micoud, Dennery, and Praslin

The magistrates did not survive.  However, the quarters or parishes did survive, as such, with some mergers and changes in the names.

Districts
Since the 2001 Census of Saint Lucia there have been 10 districts in  Saint Lucia.

Notes

A former quarter, Dauphin Quarter was merged into Gros Islet Quarter.  It was not enumerated separately in the 2010 Census.  The 2001 Census shows Daphin as part of Gros Islet.
A former quarter, Praslin Quarter was merged into Micoud Quarter.  It was not enumerated separately in the 2010 Census.  The 2001 Census shows Praslin as part of Micoud District.
The final population numbers are used in the table above.  Preliminary results published in April 2011 were different.

Political divisions

Saint Lucia electoral boundaries are based, generally, on the districts. There are 17 constituencies in Saint Lucia that are represented in the House of Assembly of Saint Lucia.  A study was done in 2014 to look into variations in census and boudaries and possible expansion of the number of constituencies.

See also
Commonwealth Local Government Forum-Americas
Geography of Saint Lucia
House of Assembly of Saint Lucia
ISO 3166-2:LC
List of Caribbean First-level Subdivisions by Total Area
List of cities in Saint Lucia

References 

Additional bibliographic references:

 
 
 
 
 

 
 
Saint Lucia, Quarters
Saint Lucia 1
First-level administrative divisions by country
Saint Lucia geography-related lists